The 2010 Pacific Netball series was held in Raratonga, Cook Islands between 3-5 June 2010.

Results

Table

Final standings

See also
 Pacific Netball Series

References

 PNG Netball Results & Tournaments since 1991. Papua New Guinea netball webpage

Pacific
2010
2010 in Oceanian sport
International netball competitions hosted by the Cook Islands
2010 in Cook Islands sport
2010 in Fijian sport
2010 in Papua New Guinean sport
2010 in Samoan sport